Straumsnes is a former municipality in Møre og Romsdal county, Norway. The  municipality existed from 1866 until its dissolution in 1964.  It included the northern part of the Straumsnes peninsula, the eastern part of the island of Aspøya, and several surrounding islands in the northern part of the present-day Tingvoll Municipality.  The administrative centre of the municipality was the village of Straumsnes where the Straumsnes Church is located.

History
On 1 January 1866, the parish of Straumsnes was separated from Tingvoll Municipality to become a new municipality. The initial population of Straumsnes was 1,222. On 1 January 1868, an uninhabited district of Halsa Municipality was transferred to Straumsnes.  During the 1960s, there were many municipal mergers across Norway due to the work of the Schei Committee. On 1 January 1964, Straumsnes Municipality (population: 1,160), the part of Frei Municipality on the island of Aspøya (population: 147), and Tingvoll Municipality (population: 3,356) were merged into a new, larger Tingvoll Municipality.

Name
The municipality was named  after the peninsula on which it is located.  The peninsula is named after the old  farming village, now called Kanestraum.

Government
All municipalities in Norway, including Straumsnes, are responsible for primary education (through 10th grade), outpatient health services, senior citizen services, unemployment and other social services, zoning, economic development, and municipal roads.  The municipality is governed by a municipal council of elected representatives, which in turn elects a mayor.

Municipal council
The municipal council  of Straumsnes was made up of 17 representatives that were elected to four year terms.  The party breakdown of the final municipal council was as follows:

See also
List of former municipalities of Norway

References

Tingvoll
Former municipalities of Norway
1866 establishments in Norway
1964 disestablishments in Norway